Thomas Bellamy (1853–1926) was a Canadian politician.

Thomas Bellamy may also refer to:

Thomas Bellamy (writer) (1745–1800), English author
Thomas Ludford Bellamy (1770–1843), English singer
Tom Bellamy (born 1980), English multi-instrumentalist